The Wild North (also known as The Big North, Constable Pedley,  The Constable Pedley Story, The Wild North Country and North Country) is a 1952 American Western film directed by Andrew Marton and starring Stewart Granger, Wendell Corey and Cyd Charisse. It was the first Ansco Color film shot.

Plot 
Jules Vincent, a French-Canadian trapper (Stewart Granger), while in a northern Canadian town, helps an attractive Indian singer (Cyd Charisse), fend off unwanted attentions of a drunken Max Brody (Howard Petrie). The next day, Vincent sets off by canoe into the Canadian wilderness, taking the Indian girl up north to her tribe, now accompanied by a contrite Brody.

When the group arrives at her Chippewa village, Vincent tells the chief (John War Eagle), after Brody had acted recklessly on the rapids that he wanted to send him a warning, shooting into the air but accidentally killing Brody when the canoe pitched wildly. Frightened by the prospect of arrest, Vincent heads into the wilderness. After North-West Mounted Police (NWMP) Constable Pedley (Wendell Corey) arrives at the village on another matter, he learns about Brody's death.

Pedley finds Vincent's cabin where the Indian girl tells him that Vincent is not a murderer. The NWMP Constable, however, is determined to  bring Vincent in, saying running away makes the trapper look guilty.

While on his trapline, Vincent finds a half-frozen Father Simon (Morgan Farley) who had gone into the wilderness, to try to persuade the trapper to turn himself in. As Father Simon pleads with Vincent and utters his dying words, Pedley arrives to arrest Vincent. Despite Vincent's warnings that the weather will turn worse, Pedley takes Vincent into custody and starts a long trek back to the NWMP station.

During the treacherous trip, Vincent tries in vain to overpower Pedley, whom he nicknames "Bebi.” When two lost trappers, Ruger (Ray Teal) and Sloan (Clancy Cooper) menace them, offering Vincent a chance to escape, Pedley observes that they will know "how good a man" Vincent is. Vincent proves his character by helping to overpower the trappers and send them away. Later, Pedley's leg is badly injured when he steps in a trap. Vincent helps him break free. They face an avalanche and a wolf attack, and an unlikely bond slowly forms between the two men. Despite Vincent's efforts, Pedley deteriorates, mentally and physically, or as Vincent puts it, "blanking out". Although he could abandon Pedley to certain death by freezing, Vincent continues to support the constable, handcuffing him to the sled to keep him moving. Eventually, he abandons the sled to have the dogs lead a delirious Pedley to the cabin.

There, the Indian girl angrily asks Vincent why he saved the man who is sworn to take him to jail. Vincent tells her that he was saved by needing to accomplish the task of bringing Pedley to safety, and by his promise to do it.  Pedley is so traumatized by the ordeal that he is unable to speak, despite Vincent and the girl's best efforts to revive him.

Shortly thereafter, while trying to discreetly buy provisions for the men at the general store, the Indian girl is approached by Callahan (J. M. Kerrigan), who hands her some tobacco free of charge and warns her that the local sergeant is looking for the two men.  He tells her that "while some men" might think Vincent and Pedley might have become lost and died in the wilderness, he knows better.

When she returns to the cabin, she finds Vincent still unable to break Pedley free from his fugue state.  Vincent decides that the two men should travel the river and brave the rapids in an attempt to shake Pedley out of his condition.  The two men embark on a harrowing journey downriver in the canoe over treacherous rapids.  Fearful for his life, Pedley finally begins speaking again, ordering Vincent to turn the canoe around, and when Vincent refuses, he tries to shoot him.   The canoe capsizes, and the two men are thrown free, nearly drowning.  As the two bedraggled men drag themselves to shore along the bank of the river, Pedley thanks Vincent.

At a court hearing, Pedley testifies about the events, including the canoe trip, and the magistrate (Holmes Herbert) orders Vincent released.  As Vincent and the Indian girl depart, they give Pedley an orange kitten and tell him to "build a house around it." He names the kitten "Bebi," and with the kitten on his shoulder, watches the couple head down the river in a canoe, free.

Cast

 Stewart Granger as Jules Vincent
 Wendell Corey as Constable Pedley
 Cyd Charisse as Indian Girl
 Morgan Farley as Father Simon
 J.M. Kerrigan as Callahan
 Howard Petrie as Brody
 Houseley Stevenson as Old Man
 Lewis Martin as Sergeant
 John War Eagle as Indian Chief
 Ray Teal as Ruger
 Clancy Cooper as Sloan

Production
The Wild North was known at one stage by the working titles, "Constable Pedley", "The Wild North Country" and "North Country". The film was based on the true story of Mountie Constable Arthur Pedley, who in 1904 was assigned to find a lost missionary in northern Alberta. He managed to succeed despite great difficulty.<ref name="times">"Mushing it in the Royal Canadian Mounties: Hollywood location unit battles Idaho blizzard making The North Country'; Factual "mushing" through below zero." The New York Times,  April 8, 1951, p. 101.</ref>

Location filming started in Idaho in March 1951 with Granger and Corey. Filming was then halted to enable Granger to make The Light Touch (1951). Filming was scheduled to resume in July in Chipewyan, Alberta, Canada, where the actual events in Pedley's story had taken place. Due to inclement weather in Canada, filming was completed in the United States.Brady, Thomas F. "Remake of comedy listed at Warners; 'Sons O'Guns,' 1929 musical by Donahue and Thompson, on Weisbart schedule." The New York Times, March 29, 1951, p. 41.The Wild North was shot in a new colour process. John Arnold, MGM's executive director of photography, and John Nicholaus, head of the studio's film laboratory, worked with Ansco for 10 years to develop the new process. It had several advantages, being able to be  used in standard black and white cameras and "... processed in the studio laboratory with essentially the same facility as black and white film ... [making] possible many time-saving steps in the handling, development and screening of daily rushes. An additional advantage noted in American Cinematographer was that the film was particularly good for 'day-for-night' shooting, which was used significantly in 'The Wild North'."

Reception
CriticalThe Wild North was critically reviewed by Bosley Crowther for The New York Times. He said, "... the picture is not of a consistent piece, either in its narration nor in its photography. There are high points and dismally low points in its generally pulp-fiction tale of how an amiable French Canadian woodsman brings in a Mountie who was sent to bring him in. The high points are reached in a sequence showing a battle of the two men with wolves and in another recording their transit of a boiling rapids in a bobbing canoe. The low points are touched when they are struggling through the obvious studio snow."

Box OfficeThe Wild North earned an estimated $2 million at the North American box office in 1952. MGM records puts this figure at $2,111,000 with earnings of $1,896,000 elsewhere, leading to a profit of $806,000. In France, the film recorded admissions of 1,746,799.

References
Notes

Bibliography

 Granger, Stewart. Sparks Fly Upward. London: Granada Publishing, 1991. .

External links
 
 
 
 
Review at Variety''

1952 films
1950s English-language films
Films directed by Andrew Marton
1952 Western (genre) films
Royal Canadian Mounted Police in fiction
Metro-Goldwyn-Mayer films
American Western (genre) films
Northern (genre) films
Films scored by Bronisław Kaper
American survival films
1950s American films